Moses Kiarie Kuria is a Kenyan politician and the Cabinet Secretary(CS) for Investments, Trade and Industry having been appointed by President William Ruto, and successfully vetted by the 13th Parliament of Kenya. He was sworn in on 27 October 2022 as the new CS for Investments, Trade and Industry replacing Betty Maina.

Political career 
Kuria is a staunch admirer of former President Kibaki. He attributes his admiration for politics to the former president. His political journey started when he joined Kibaki's team through Uhuru Kenyatta's Kanu Party.

Following the death of the then member of parliament for Gatundu South, Hon. Jossy Ngugi, Moses Kuria was elected unopposed as the new MP in 2014 on TNA party. He was re-elected as an MP during the 2017 general elections to serve for a 5-year parliamentary term, running until 2022 on Jubilee Party. In 2021, he founded a new party Chama Cha Kazi. He was succeeded by Gabriel Kagombe in the 2022 General Election.

During the 2022 general elections, he unsuccessfully vied for governor of Kiambu county. He lost the race to Kimani Wamatangi and conceded defeat stating that he would proceed to pursue a different course in the private sector. On 27 September 2022, he was appointed as Cabinet secretary for Investments, Trade and Industry.

Controversy 
Kuria's political career has been marred by controversy. He has been incarcerated severally and charged with hate speech. His ravaging attacks on Kenya's opposition has created a sharp schism among political protagonists; while the opponents feel that Kuria is a 'loose cannon' who is poised to incite his community against the others, his proponents believe that he is an ardent defender of their interests in the political arena.

References

Living people
Members of the National Assembly (Kenya)
Year of birth missing (living people)
Members of the 11th Parliament of Kenya
Members of the 12th Parliament of Kenya
Jubilee Party politicians
21st-century Kenyan politicians
Leaders of political parties in Kenya
Kenyan political party founders